The Aubrac is a French breed of domestic beef cattle. It originates on the Plateau de l'Aubrac in the Massif Central in central southern France, from which it also takes its name. It has a wheat-coloured coat and dark hooves, switch, muzzle and eyes.

History 

The Aubrac originated in the early nineteenth century on the Plateau de l'Aubrac in the Massif Central, which spans the modern départements of the Aveyron, the Cantal and the Lozère, in the regions of Auvergne-Rhône-Alpes and Occitanie.

Some limited cross-breeding took place in the twentieth century: with the Mézine, now extinct, 1935–1945; with the Maraîchine, 1945–1955; and with the Parthenaise, 1955–1975.

The conservation status of the Aubrac is not at risk. In 2014 the population was reported at about 170 000 head.

Characteristics 

The Aubrac is robust, frugal, fertile and long-lived, and is well adapted to the mountain environment of the Massif Central. Temperamentally, it is noted for its equable and gentle disposition. It is reported to be resistant to trypanosomiasis, the "sleeping-sickness" transmitted by tsetse flies.

The Aubrac has a uniformly wheaten coat, with black skin and black hooves, black muzzle, tongue, switch, and natural openings. Bulls may carry darker markings to the coat. The horns are lyre-shaped and tipped with black.

Use 

The Aubrac is raised for principally for meat. Bullocks weigh about  when weaned. Some milk from Aubrac cows is used in the production of Laguiole cheese; it is hoped that this proportion may reach 10%.

References 

Cattle breeds originating in France
Cattle breeds